Miss America is a superheroine from the . She was first created by Quality Comics in Military Comics #1 (August 1941), and was carried over to DC Comics when they purchased Quality in the 1950s. While the original Golden Age character is in public domain, the subsequent versions created by DC Comics are not.

Fall 1941 was a boom period for patriotic superheroes as the country prepared to enter World War II; during this period, comic book publishers also launched Miss Victory, the Star-Spangled Kid, U.S. Jones, the Fighting Yank, the Flag, Captain Flag and Yank and Doodle, among others.

Fictional character biography

Pre-Crisis history
Miss America is originally Joan Dale, a courageous reporter who had a dream in which the Statue of Liberty appeared to her and, giving her the power to transmute elements, instructed her to battle evil. Joan awakes to find that she now has these powers. Adopting a patriotically-themed costume, she begins fighting evil as Miss America.

She had a brief run in Military Comics #1-7, then faded into obscurity to a degree that Timely Comics (later Marvel Comics) soon felt free to create an unrelated character with the same name.

Initially, Miss America did not have a superhero costume, largely using her powers surreptitiously. In later stories she wears a costume consisting of a sleeveless red blouse, a red-and-white striped skirt, and a blue cape fastened with a silver star. This costume continually changes in appearance, possibly because she uses her powers to create it. Following her initial run, later appearances of the character add a red domino mask.

In the 1980s, writer Roy Thomas revived the character. She is briefly referenced in the first appearance of the Freedom Fighters in the pages of All-Star Squadron, when she is said to have been a member of that group who was thought to have had been killed when Uncle Sam attempted to prevent the attack on Pearl Harbor from occurring on Earth-X.

Post-Crisis history
In the post-Crisis on Infinite Earths continuity, in the late spring of 1941 on Liberty Island, reporter Joan Dale has a dream that the Statue of Liberty comes to life and grants her the power to alter the nature of matter. Inspired by the dream, she creates a colorful costume and becomes Miss America, one of America's first heroines. In truth, she had been abducted by the top secret government agency, Project M, and her powers were actually the result of a secret experiment. They believed the experiment to be a failure and had returned her to whence she had been taken, leaving her none the wiser.

Later that year, the Japanese plot their attack on Pearl Harbor. Uncle Sam learns of the attack and assembles a group of heroes called the Freedom Fighters (with Hourman, the Invisible Hood, Magno, Neon the Unknown, and the Red Torpedo) to prevent it. The mission is doomed and all but Uncle Sam seemingly perish in the fight. Sam later discovers that three of his allies had survived, Miss America among them. After the mission, she is reclaimed by Project M.

When Robotman and the Young All-Stars visit Project M, they discover that Miss America is indeed alive, albeit comatose. A battle with the Ultra-Humanite breaks out, which awakens Joan from her coma. She promptly returns to the defense of her country and in late May 1942, she joins the Justice Society of America as the group's secretary.

In post-Crisis continuity, the original Golden Age Wonder Woman's adventures had been erased from existence and Miss America replaces her in many of the JSA's adventures. However, following a retcon in Wonder Woman (vol. 2) #128, several months after Miss America joins the JSA, a different Wonder Woman debuts on the scene and also joins the JSA. It is still unclear how this Wonder Woman's membership affected Miss America's status with the JSA, if at all.

Miss America is last seen as an active heroine in a flashback in JSA, where she is once more working with the Freedom Fighters.

Retirement
Eventually, Joan Dale's powers fade and she retires as Miss America. She marries Admiral Derek Trevor, and eventually they become the adoptive parents of Hippolyta "Lyta" Trevor Hall, who becomes the modern-day Fury in Infinity, Inc.

Lyta becomes pregnant with the child of her teammate and lover, Hector Hall, but the latter later dies. She moves back home with her adoptive parents, Joan and Derek Trevor, and is soon reunited with Hector, who has become the new Sandman. Learning that Hector can only exist for one hour outside the Dream Dimension, Lyta and Hector marry and Lyta joins Hector in the Dream Dimension. Joan and Derek Trevor attend the wedding.

While Joan Dale does not make a present-day appearance in The Sandman comic-book series, she does appear in a photograph as Miss America in The Sandman #57.

One Year Later

A much older Joan Dale returns in the fifth issue of Uncle Sam and the Freedom Fighters (January 2007) to confront a youthful imposter bearing the mantle who has, under the orders of Father Time, managed to neutralize and capture the new team of Freedom Fighters.

In issue #6, Joan reveals that she never lost her powers, but used them to create the illusion that she had aged in order to retire and live a normal life with her husband. Now that Derek Trevor has died, she lets the illusion slip and resumes her youthful, heroic guise to aid Uncle Sam and his new team. While fighting the impostor Miss America, Joan discovers that the impostor is a gynoid and destroys her.

Miss Cosmos
In the new 2007 Uncle Sam and the Freedom Fighters series, Red Bee mutated into an alien-insect creature and mind-controls Joan into absorbing Human Bomb's explosive energy and taking it into space. Joan then explodes, presumed to be dead. Unbeknownst to her allies, Joan manages to keep her consciousness alive, rebuilding a new, young body from extant space materials. Evolved into a new form of life, she discards her Miss America identity to claim her new moniker: Miss Cosmos.

The New 52
In 2011, "The New 52" rebooted the DC universe. Joan Dale makes her debut in Human Bomb #2. Depicted as a telepath, she helps Michael Taylor to control his powers and gather information about the criminal organization C.R.O.W.N.

The New Golden Age
A panel in "The New Golden Age" one-shot revealed in the bios of Betsy Ross and Molly Pitcher that Miss America was taking on a saboteur called Moth at a school. This inspired friends Betsy Rose and Molly Preacher to take on the names of Betsy Ross and Molly Pitcher in order to help Miss America take on Moth's plans to destroy the Statue of Liberty. Afterwards, Miss America gave them the relics of Betsy Ross and Molly Pitcher as she took them on as her sidekicks until the days after World War II when both girls mysteriously vanished.

Powers and abilities
Miss America has the powers of transmutation on a molecular level. Her own inexperience with the physical sciences initially curtailed her use of the powers early in her career, usually using it for simple changes that were not permanent. There appeared to be an upper limit to the size of matter, and the duration of its transmutation, but this was never made specific.

Following her recent return, Miss America appears to have become much more proficient with her powers, claiming that she would be able to transform an enemy's organs to glass or shrink them to microscopic size. Joan grew so proficient in the use of her abilities that she could change her own age at will, from an elderly woman of considerable age to a younger one in her physical prime. 

The impostor version who appears in Uncle Sam and the Freedom Fighters #5-6 could fire energy blasts and possessed the ability to psionically neutralize the Freedom Fighters' powers. Both boasted flight powers and increased physicality but it was never clarified if these were separate aspects of it or not.

Her powers grew so strong that her disembodied consciousness reconstructed a new physical body out of Star Stuff from the universe after dying from absorbing an explosive detonation. Bestowing her vast cosmic powers, enough to tear through alien warships (which seem to've faded with time) as well as hinting at an odd form of Regeneration and Immortality through her total conversion abilities.

Other versions

Princess Diana

As depicted in Wonder Woman (vol. 2) #184-185, Princess Diana briefly assumes the identity of Miss America.

In this storyline, Diana and her then love interest, Trevor Barnes, recently complete an adventure in Skartaris and attempt to return to their proper dimension. Instead of arriving in the present, they arrive in Virginia in early October 1943. Leaving Trevor to watch the dinosaurs and Villainy Inc. (whom they battled in Skartaris), Diana goes scouting and witnesses a battle between Queen Clea (from the 1943 time period) and Diana's mother, Queen Hippolyta. Noticing that Clea is getting the upper hand in the battle, Diana decides to intervene. To avoid damaging the timestream, she disguises herself as "an obscure heroine during the war" (Miss America), whom she remembers that Hippolyta mentioned meeting once. Together, Miss America (Diana) and Hippolyta defeat the Nazis and Clea; however, one of the Nazis escapes, finds Trevor, and takes Poseidon's Trident from him.

Later that same day, Hippolyta and Diana return to Washington, D.C., where Diana sees for herself the impact her mother had on the women of the city (including Hippolyta's roommate, Diana Prince). As night falls, Hippolyta and Diana (as Miss America) go hunting for Armageddon, the leader of the saboteurs. While Hippolyta defeats Armageddon, Diana recovers Poseidon's Trident and disappears. By this time, however, Hippolyta realizes that the woman she fought alongside was not the real Miss America. Either that night or the next night, Hippolyta makes a phone call to the real Miss America (Joan Dale) and confirms her suspicions. After Diana returns to the present, she realizes that her mother must have discovered that she was impersonating the real Miss America.

Elseworlds
Outside of regular DC Comics continuity, James Robinson and Paul Smith feature Miss America in 1993's The Golden Age. Joan Dale is the girlfriend of Tex Thompson, also known as Mr. America.

Later in the story, disturbed by the increasingly moody and abusive actions of her lover, Joan steals Thompson's locked journal and heads to her friend Paula Brooks, the reformed costumed thief once known as the Huntress/Tigress. Paula picks the lock and soon Joan, Paula, and Paula's lover, Lance Gallant, are made aware of the same ugly fact that Paul Kirk has finally remembered: Tex Thompson is really the Ultra-Humanite. The journal, however, holds even worse revelations, prompting Paula to call Johnny Chambers, whom the story has characterized as the one superhero that everyone else came to with their problems.

In the story's final chapter, a hasty war council is convened of the few mystery-men who know Thompson's secret, and a plan is made: during the upcoming ceremony in Washington at which all of America's superheroes are supposed to swear their loyalty, another new recruit will be named to Thompson's camp, who will then expose the truth about Thompson before the superhero community and the eyes of the world.

To withstand the strength Thompson has at his disposal, the whistle-blower has to be one of the more powerful heroes, and Rex Tyler is elected. Nearly every mystery-man and superhero turns out at the nation's capital for the ceremony, but before things can begin, Joan takes to the podium and exposes Thompson herself. Before she can tell the entire truth, Robotman brutally murders her.

In other media
Joan Dale appears in Reign of the Supermen, voiced by Jennifer Hale. Here, she is depicted as a President of America.

References

External links
Miss America at Comic Vine

DC Comics characters who can move at superhuman speeds
DC Comics characters who can teleport
DC Comics characters who have mental powers
DC Comics characters with superhuman strength
DC Comics female superheroes
DC Comics metahumans
Fictional characters with elemental transmutation abilities
Fictional characters with immortality
Fictional characters with slowed ageing
Fictional women soldiers and warriors
Golden Age superheroes
Quality Comics superheroes
United States-themed superheroes
Comics characters introduced in 1941